Enemy of the Police is a 1933 British comedy film directed by George King and starring John Stuart, Viola Keats and A. Bromley Davenport. It was made at Teddington Studios as a quota quickie by Warner Brothers.

Cast
 John Stuart as John Meakin  
 Viola Keats as Preston  
 A. Bromley Davenport as Sir Lemuel Tapleigh  
 Margaret Yarde as Lady Tapleigh  
 Violet Farebrother as Lady Salterton  
 Ernest Sefton as Slingsby  
 Winifred Oughton as Martha Teavle  
 Alf Goddard as Gallagher  
 Molly Fisher as Ann  
 Hal Walters as Bagshaw

References

Bibliography
 Chibnall, Steve. Quota Quickies: The Birth of the British 'B' Film. British Film Institute, 2007.

External links

1933 films
British comedy films
1933 comedy films
Films shot at Teddington Studios
Films directed by George King
Warner Bros. films
Quota quickies
Films set in England
British black-and-white films
1930s English-language films
1930s British films